Rakesh Kumar Oram (born 31 October 1997) is an Indian professional footballer who plays as a midfielder for Mumbai City in the Indian Super League.

Career
Born in Chituapada, Odisha, Oram was scouted by Gangadhar Behera, the head coach of the Sambalpur Football Academy in 2010 during a talent search. While with Sambalpur, Oram helped the academy win the Biju Pattnaik Gold Cup while also representing his state in junior football competitions. In 2012, Oram was selected to join the AIFF Regional Academy in Mumbai before moving onto the AIFF Elite Academy.

Mumbai City
In September 2016 Oram was listed as part of the Mumbai City squad for the 2016 Indian Super League season. He made his professional debut for the team on 21 October 2016 against Goa.

International
Oram has represented India at the under-15 and under-19 levels.

Personal life
Oram's brother, Bekey Oram, is also a footballer who plays for Bengaluru FC 'B' and has represented India at U-16 level.

Career statistics

References

External links 
 Indian Super League Profile.

1997 births
Living people
Indian footballers
Mumbai City FC players
Association football midfielders
Footballers from Odisha
Indian Super League players
India youth international footballers